The Thomas B. Jeffery Company was an American automobile manufacturer in Kenosha, Wisconsin, from 1902 until 1916. The company manufactured the Rambler and Jeffery brand motorcars. It was preceded by the Gormully & Jeffery Manufacturing Company, a bicycle manufacturer.  It was the parent company to Nash Motors, thus one of the parent companies of American Motors Corporation (AMC) and later Chrysler.

Thomas B. Jeffery 

Thomas B. Jeffery was an inventor and an industrialist. He was one of America's first entrepreneurs interested in automobiles in the late 19th century. In 1897, he built his first prototype motorcar. Thomas B. Jeffery was serious enough about automobiles to sell his stake in Gormully & Jeffery to the American Bicycle Company to finance his new car company.

Business 

Charles T. Jeffery's (Thomas' son) experimental prototypes of 1901 (Models A & B) used at least two radical innovations – steering wheels and front-mounted engines. By the time Charles was ready for production in 1902, his father had talked him out of these wild dreams and convinced him to stick with tillers and engines under the seat.

From 1902 until 1908, Jeffery moved steadily to bigger, more reliable models starting with the 1902 Model C. Jeffery cars were built on assembly lines (the second manufacturer to adopt them—Ransom E. Olds was first), and in 1903 Jeffery sold 1,350 Ramblers. By 1905, Jeffery more than doubled this number. One reason may have been because Charles went back to the steering wheel before 1904. In 1907, Jeffery was building a large variety of different body styles and sizes. Among them was a five-passenger, US$2,500 Rambler weighing  and powered by a  engine.

In April 1910, Thomas B. Jeffery, died in Pompeii, Italy, and in June of that year, the business was incorporated under the name of the Thomas B. Jeffery Company, with Charles T. Jeffery as the president and general manager, H. W. Jeffery, vice president and treasurer.

In 1915, Charles T. Jeffery, changed the automotive branding from Rambler to Jeffery to honor the founder, his father, Thomas B. Jeffery.

As of 1916, G. H. Eddy replaced H.W. Jeffery as the treasurer so H.W. Jeffery could focus on the position of vice president. G. W. Greiner was the secretary, L. H. Bill the general manager, J. W. DeCou the factory manager, and Al Recke was the sales manager.

Charles T. Jeffery survived the sinking of the RMS Lusitania (a British luxury liner torpedoed by the Germans in World War I) in 1915 and decided to spend the rest of his life in a more enjoyable manner. 

Charles W. Nash was caught in a power struggle for leadership at General Motors (GM) after successfully refocusing the automaker's management and production as well as increasing its sales and profits. Although "Billy" Durant offered Nash an annual salary of $1 million to continue working for GM, Nash saw an opportunity to exercise complete control over a company and purchased the Thomas B. Jeffery Company in August 1916. In 1918, Nash renamed the company to Nash Motors.

The Factory 

Jeffery, with the money from his sale of Gormully & Jeffery, bought the old Sterling Bicycle Company's factory in Kenosha, Wisconsin. The original factory building was only  in size.

By 1916, the company's buildings expanded to cover over  under roof and all of its facilities had grown to over  that included a test track.

Automotive production would continue on the original sites under a number of succeeding companies. The last facility in Kenosha, known as Kenosha Engine, was finally closed by Chrysler in 2010.

Jeffery Quad 

The Jeffery Quad, also known as the Nash Quad or Quad is a four-wheel drive truck that was developed and built in Kenosha from 1913, and after 1916, by Nash Motors, as well as under license by other truck makers. The Quad introduced numerous engineering innovations. Its design and durability proved effective in traversing the muddy, rough, and unpaved roads of the times. 

The Quad also became one of the effective work vehicles in World War I. 

The Quad was also one of the first successful four-wheel drive vehicles ever to be made, and its production continued unchanged through 1928, or 15 years, with a total of 41,674 units made.

Timeline 

1897 – Jeffery builds a rear-engine Rambler prototype using the Rambler name previously used on a highly successful line of bicycles made by Gormully & Jeffery.

1899 – Positive reviews at the 1899 Chicago International Exhibition & Tournament and the first National Automobile Show in New York City prompt the Jefferys to enter the automobile business.

1900 (Dec 6) – Thomas B. Jeffery finalizes a US$65,000 deal to buy the Kenosha, Wisconsin, factory of the defunct Sterling Bicycle with money from the sale of his interest in Gormully & Jeffery.

1901 – Two more prototypes, Models A and B, are made.

1902 – First production Ramblers – the US$750 Model C open runabout and the $850 Model D (the same car with a folding top). First-year production totals 1,500 units making Jeffery the second-largest car maker behind Oldsmobile.

1910 (Mar 21) – Thomas B. Jeffery dies while on vacation in Italy.

1910 (Jun 10) – Charles incorporates the firm as a $3 million (US$ in  dollars) public stock company.

1914 – The Rambler name is replaced with the Jeffery moniker in honor of the founder.

1916 (Aug) – Charles Jeffery sells the company to former General Motors Corp. President Charles W. Nash.

1917 – Charles Nash renames the Jeffery Motor Company, Nash Motors after himself.

Notes

External links 

 1916 advertisement for Jeffery Quad, p. 481
 Schematic drawing of Jeffery Quad chassis
 Data sheet for Armored Car #1 (U.S. Army), build on Jeffery Quad chassis at Rock Island Arsenal, 1916
 Photo of armored rear-drive Jeffery truck (not a Quad)

Motor vehicle manufacturers based in Wisconsin
Companies based in Kenosha, Wisconsin
Nash Motors
Rambler vehicles
Defunct motor vehicle manufacturers of the United States
Defunct truck manufacturers of the United States
Defunct manufacturing companies based in Wisconsin
Vehicle manufacturing companies established in 1902
Vehicle manufacturing companies disestablished in 1916
1902 establishments in Wisconsin
1916 disestablishments in Wisconsin
Veteran vehicles
Brass Era vehicles
1900s cars
1910s cars
Cars introduced in 1902